The 2018–19 Polish Cup was the 62nd edition of the Polish Volleyball Cup tournament.

ZAKSA Kędzierzyn-Koźle beat Jastrzębski Węgiel in the final (3–1) and won its seventh Polish Cup.

Final four
 Venue: Hala Orbita, Wrocław
 All times are Central European Time (UTC+01:00).

Semifinals
|}

Final

|}

Final standings

Awards

Most Valuable Player	
  Aleksander Śliwka (ZAKSA Kędzierzyn-Koźle)
Best Server
  Dawid Konarski (Jastrzębski Węgiel)
Best Receiver	
  Rafał Szymura (ZAKSA Kędzierzyn-Koźle)
Best Defender
  Paweł Zatorski (ZAKSA Kędzierzyn-Koźle)
	
Best Blocker	
  Łukasz Wiśniewski (ZAKSA Kędzierzyn-Koźle)
Best Opposite
  Łukasz Kaczmarek (ZAKSA Kędzierzyn-Koźle)
Best Setter
  Benjamin Toniutti (ZAKSA Kędzierzyn-Koźle)

See also
 2018–19 PlusLiga

References

External links
 Official website

Polish Cup
Polish Cup
Polish Cup
Polish Cup